Branišovice is a municipality and village in Brno-Country District in the South Moravian Region of the Czech Republic. It has about 600 inhabitants.

References

Villages in Brno-Country District